General elections were held in Sierra Leone on 17 November 2012.  The result was a sweeping victory for the ruling All People's Congress. Its leader, incumbent president Ernest Bai Koroma, won 58.7% of the vote, enough to win a second term without the need for a runoff. The APC also won 67 of the 112 elected seats in Parliament. To date, it is the APC's best showing at an election since the restoration of multiparty politics in 1991.

Candidates
In April 2007, the APC endorsed incumbent Ernest Bai Koroma for a second term. He was challenged by former President and general Julius Maada Bio of the Sierra Leone People's Party. On July 31, 2011, Bio defeated Usman Boie Kamara for the party's nomination.

In the elections for the twelve Chief seats in Parliament, only four were contested.

Results

President
Koroma won 59% of the vote in the first round, exceeding the 55 percent threshold required to win the presidency in a single round.

By district

Parliament

By-elections
Three seats were left vacant, with no election taking place in constituencies 5, 12 and 92 (Western Area Rural District). The election was delayed in Western Area Rural District due to the death of PMDC candidate, and a by-election was held on 9 February 2013. The result was a victory for the APC candidate, who received 61% of the vote.

Aftermath
Results showed Koroma winning in the first round of voting, receiving 58.7% of the vote against 37.4% for the SLPP candidate, Bio. If he had received less than 55% of the vote, a second round would have been necessary. Following the announcement of results, Koroma was promptly sworn in for another term as President on 23 November 2012. He said that he would "continue to attract investment" and "continue to fight corruption".

References

General
Elections in Sierra Leone
Sierra Leone
Presidential elections in Sierra Leone
Sierra
Election and referendum articles with incomplete results